Strawberry Cirque is a semi-circular glacial cirque in Antarctica, 1 nautical mile (1.9 km) wide, at the south end of Macdonald Bluffs in Miller Range. It indents the cliff, at the north side of the terminus of Argo Glacier where the latter enters Marsh Glacier. So named by the Ohio State University Geological Party, 1967–68, because the granite cliffs of the cirque have a bright pink to red color in certain lighting.

Cirques of Antarctica
Landforms of Oates Land